Douglas Mackintosh (born 7 March 1931) is a British alpine skier. He competed in the men's downhill at the 1956 Winter Olympics.

References

1931 births
Living people
British male alpine skiers
Olympic alpine skiers of Great Britain
Alpine skiers at the 1956 Winter Olympics
Sportspeople from London